New Nationalism was Theodore Roosevelt's Progressive political platform during the 1912 election.

Speech
Roosevelt made the case for what he called "the New Nationalism" in a speech in Osawatomie, Kansas, on August 31, 1910. The central issue he argued was government protection of human welfare and property rights, but he also argued that human welfare was more important than property rights.  He insisted that only a powerful federal government could regulate the economy and guarantee justice, and that a President can succeed in making his economic agenda successful only if he makes the protection of human welfare his highest priority. Roosevelt believed that the concentration in industry was a natural part of the economy. He wanted executive agencies, not courts, to regulate business. The federal government should be used to protect the laboring men, women and children from exploitation. In terms of policy, Roosevelt's platform included a broad range of social and political reforms advocated by progressives.

Socioeconomic policy
In the socioeconomic sphere, the platform called for the following:
 A National Health Service to include all existing government medical agencies
 Social insurance to provide for the elderly, the unemployed, and the disabled.
 Limited injunctions in strikes.
 A minimum wage law for women.
 An eight-hour workday.
 A federal securities commission.
 Farm relief.
 Workers' compensation for work-related injuries.
 An inheritance tax.
 A constitutional amendment to allow a federal income tax.

Electoral reform
The electoral reforms proposed included
 Women's suffrage.
 Direct election of Senators.
 Primary elections for state and federal nominations.

Anti-corporatocracy proposals

The main theme of the platform was an attack on what he perceived as the domination of politics by business interests, which allegedly controlled both established parties. The platform asserted:

To destroy this invisible Government, to dissolve the unholy alliance between corrupt business and corrupt politics is the first task of the statesmanship of the day.

To that end, the platform called for the following:
 Strict limits and disclosure requirements on political campaign contributions.
 Registration of lobbyists.
 Recording and publication of Congressional committee proceedings.

Influences and comparisons
The book The Promise of American Life, written in 1909 by Herbert Croly, Theodore Roosevelt. New Nationalism was in direct contrast with Woodrow Wilson's policy of The New Freedom, which promoted antitrust modification, tariff reduction, and banking and currency reform.

According to Lewis L. Gould, "The Progressive party did not go as far as the New Deal of Franklin D. Roosevelt would, but it represented a long step in that direction."

Quotations
 "I do not ask for overcentralization; but I do ask that we work in a spirit of broad and far-reaching nationalism when we work for what concerns our people as a whole. We are all Americans. Our common interests are as broad as the continent. I speak to you here in Kansas exactly as I would speak in New York or Georgia, for the most vital problems are those which affect us all alike."
 "The essence of any struggle for healthy liberty has always been, and must always be, to take from some one man or class of men the right to enjoy power, or wealth, or position, or immunity, which has not been earned by service to his or their fellows. That is what you fought for in the Civil War, and that is what we strive for now."
 "We grudge no man a fortune in civil life if it is honorably obtained and well used. It is not even enough that it should have gained without doing damage to the community. We should permit it to be gained only so long as the gaining represents benefit to the community."

See also
Square Deal
Progressive nationalism
Progressive Party (United States, 1912)
The New Freedom
New Deal
Fair Deal

Notes

Further reading
 online

Theodore Roosevelt
United States presidential domestic programs
Progressive Era in the United States
Left-wing nationalism
Liberalism in the United States
Progressivism in the United States
Progressive conservatism